Qabu Shamsiyeh  is a Syrian village located in Masyaf Nahiyah in Masyaf District, Hama.  According to the Syria Central Bureau of Statistics (CBS), Qabu Shamsiyeh had a population of 345 in the 2004 census.

References 

Populated places in Masyaf District